Mauro Daniel Rodrigues Teixeira (born 15 April 2001) is a professional footballer who plays as a midfielder for Swiss club Yverdon on loan from FC Sion. Born in Portugal, Rodrigues represents the Guinea-Bissau national team.

Club career
On 21 February 2021, Rodrigues signed a professional contract with FC Sion. He made his professional debut with Sion in a 2–1 Swiss Super League loss to Servette FC on 14 March 2021.

On 15 June 2022, Rodrigues joined Yverdon on loan.

International career
Born in Portugal, Rodrigues is of Bissau-Guinean descent. He was called up to represent the Guinea Bissau national team on 18 March 2021. He debuted with Guinea Bissau in a 3–0 2021 Africa Cup of Nations qualification win over Congo on 30 March 2021.

References

External links
 
 
 
 SFL Profile

2001 births
Living people
Citizens of Guinea-Bissau through descent
Bissau-Guinean footballers
Guinea-Bissau international footballers
Portuguese footballers
Portuguese people of Bissau-Guinean descent
Association football wingers
FC Sion players
Yverdon-Sport FC players
Swiss Super League players
Swiss Promotion League players
Swiss Challenge League players
Bissau-Guinean expatriate footballers
Portuguese expatriate footballers
Portuguese expatriate sportspeople in Switzerland
Bissau-Guinean expatriate sportspeople in Switzerland
Expatriate footballers in Switzerland
2021 Africa Cup of Nations players